Boxing the Clown is the fourth album by Helios Creed, released in 1990 through Amphetamine Reptile Records.

Track listing

Personnel 
Musicians
Helios Creed – vocals, guitar, sampler, production
Mark Duran – bass guitar
Rey Washam – drums, percussion, production
Production and additional personnel
Jonathan Burnside – production, engineering
Tom Hazelmyer – cover art

References

External links 
 

1990 albums
Amphetamine Reptile Records albums
Helios Creed albums